Stephen H. Haber (born July 12, 1957) is a professor of political science and history known for his work on the political institutions and economic policies that promote innovation and improvements in living standards.  Haber is a professor in the School of Humanities and Sciences at Stanford University and a senior fellow of the Hoover Institution, the Stanford Institute for Economic Policy Research, and the Stanford Center for International Development.  He directs the Hoover Institution's Working Group on Intellectual Property, Innovation, and Prosperity.

Education and career 

Haber received his B.A. degree from the George Washington University in 1979, his M.A. from UCLA in 1981, and his Ph.D. degree from UCLA in 1985.  Following the receipt of his Ph.D., he began work as an assistant professor at Columbia University in 1985.

In 1987 Haber became an assistant professor at Stanford University.  Since 2003 he has been the A.A. and Jeanne Welch Milligan Professor in the School of Humanities and Sciences.  From 1997–2011 he served as the Director of the Social Science History Program, and from 1995–1998 he served as the Associate Dean for the Social Sciences and Director of Graduate Studies in the School of Humanities and Sciences.

Haber is among Stanford's most distinguished teachers, having been awarded every teaching prize Stanford has to offer. He is the only member of the Stanford faculty to have been awarded the Dean's Award for Distinguished Teaching (twice, in 1992 and again in 2002), the Allan V. Cox Medal for Faculty Excellence in Fostering Undergraduate Research, the Phi Beta Kappa Teaching Prize, and the Walter J. Gores Award for Excellence in Teaching, which is Stanford's highest teaching honor. Haber's abilities as a teacher and mentor were acknowledged by the Economic History Association, which at its 2013 meeting awarded him the Jonathan R. Hughes Prize for Excellence in Teaching.

Work 
Haber's work has focused on how regulatory and supervisory agencies are often used by incumbent firms to stifle competition, thereby curtailing economic opportunities and slowing technological progress.  His most recent book (coauthored with Charles Calomiris), Fragile by Design: The Political Origins of Banking Crises and Scarce Credit, examines why governments often choose to craft banking regulatory policies in ways that stifle competition and increase systemic risk.

Haber is currently at work in two research areas.  One is the impact of geography on the evolution of societies' fundamental economic and political institutions.   His research in this area has been featured in the mainstream press.   His other current area of interest is the impact of the U.S. patent system on innovation and competition among firms.

References

External links 
 Profile at Stanford University's Department of Political Science
 Profile at the Stanford University Hoover Institution
 SSRN Page
 Hoover Institution Working Group on Intellectual Property, Innovation, and Prosperity
 http://stephen-haber.com
 

American political scientists
21st-century American historians
American male non-fiction writers
Stanford University faculty
Stanford University Department of Political Science faculty
1957 births
Living people
21st-century American male writers